Zuus Undapp (3 April 1934 – 1 June 2018) was an Indonesian fencer. She competed in the women's individual foil event at the 1960 Summer Olympics.

References

External links
 

1934 births
2018 deaths
People from Manado
Indonesian female foil fencers
Olympic fencers of Indonesia
Fencers at the 1960 Summer Olympics
Sportspeople from North Sulawesi
20th-century Indonesian women